The Republic of Vietnam Navy (RVNN; ; HQVNCH) was the naval branch of the South Vietnamese military, the official armed forces of the former Republic of Vietnam (or South Vietnam) from 1955 to 1975. The early fleet consisted of boats from France; after 1955, and the transfer of the armed forces to Vietnamese control, the fleet was supplied from the United States. With American assistance, in 1972 the VNN became the largest Southeast Asian navy and, by some estimates, the fourth largest navy in the world, just behind the Soviet Union, the United States and the People's Republic of China, with 42,000 personnel, 672 amphibious ships and craft, 20 mine warfare vessels, 450 patrol craft, 56 service craft, and 242 junks. Other sources state that VNN was the ninth largest navy in the world. The Republic of Vietnam Navy was responsible for the protection of the country's national waters, islands, and interests of its maritime economy, as well as for the co-ordination of maritime police, customs service and the maritime border defence force.

The Republic of Vietnam Navy disbanded in 1975 with the collapse of South Vietnam, and North Vietnam's victory in the Vietnam War. Most of its fleet was captured in port, but a small fleet of vessels, led by Captain Đỗ Kiếm and Richard L. Armitage of the Defense Attaché Office, Saigon, escaped to Thailand and surrendered themselves to American naval forces there. Some of these RVNN vessels were scuttled upon reaching the open sea, while others continued their service with the Philippine Navy.



History

Foundation
The origins of the Viet Nam Navy (VNN) began in 1952 with the French Navy. In 1954, following the Élysée Accords, the French handed control of the armed forces to the Vietnamese, but at the Vietnamese government's request, continued to be in charge of the Navy until 20 August 1955. By this time the Navy numbered about 2,000 personnel, with 22 vessels. The Vietnamese then received assistance in the development of the VNN from the United States Military Assistance Advisory Group.

Coastal Force
In 1956, the North Vietnamese began infiltrating men and arms into the Republic of Vietnam's territory by sea. In response the VNN created the Coastal Junk Force of junks manned by Regional Irregular Forces and local fishermen recruited for the occasion, to patrol the waters around the Demilitarized Zone. The force later came to be known as Coastal Groups, and patrolled the entire  coastline. This force was under the control of the regional military zone commands rather than the Navy, and was not incorporated into the VNN until 1965, by which time it numbered over 100 vessels.

Expansion of the VNN

In the late 1950s, the Vietnam Navy was being modernized and developed, receiving ships and training from the United States Navy. By 1961, the VNN had a force of 23 ships, the largest of which were LSMs, 197 boats, and 5,000 men. This was insufficient to counter the growing threat of enemy infiltration and the years 1962-1964 were marked by a rapid expansion; training facilities, repair bases, and support facilities were established; communications equipment and networks improved; organization and administrative procedures strengthened. The number of ships increased to 44 and the number of personnel to 8,100.

This process continued and by the end of 1967, the personnel strength of the VNN had increased to 16,300, with 65 ships, along with 232 vessels of the River Assault Group (RAG), 290 junks, and 52 miscellaneous craft. Throughout 1968, the VNN gave priority to the improvement and expansion of their training programs in anticipation of gaining increased responsibility in the war effort as well as additional assets from the US. By the end of 1968, plans for the turnover of the majority of the United States Navy assets in Vietnam had been formulated.

Politics and coups
VNN commander Captain Hồ Tấn Quyền, was a loyal supporter of President Ngô Đình Diệm. In order to prevent him supporting Diệm in the 1963 South Vietnamese coup, he was executed by fellow VNN officers on the morning of 1 November 1963.

During the 1965 South Vietnamese coup, rebel forces surrounded the VNN headquarters at the Saigon Naval Shipyard, apparently in an attempt to capture VNN commander Chung Tấn Cang. However, this was unsuccessful and Cang moved the fleet to Nhà Bè Base to prevent the rebels from seizing the ships.

Vietnamization
In early 1969, President Richard M. Nixon formally adopted the policy of "Vietnamization". The naval part, called ACTOV ("Accelerated Turnover to the Vietnamese"), involved the phased transfer to Vietnam of the U.S. river and coastal fleet, as well as operational command over various operations. In mid-1969, the VNN took sole responsibility for river assault operations when the U.S. Mobile Riverine Force stood down and transferred 64 riverine assault craft to the VNN. On 10 October 1969, 80 Patrol Boat, Rivers (PBR) were transferred to the VNN at the Saigon Naval Shipyard, the PBRs were divided into four River Patrol Groups (RPGs) as part of Task Force 212.
 
By the end of 1970, the U.S. Navy ceased all operations throughout South Vietnam, having transferred a total of 293 PBRs and 224 riverine assault craft to the VNN.

During 1970 and 1971, the United States also relinquished control of the coastal and high seas patrols to the VNN. The U.S. naval command also transferred four Coast Guard cutters, a destroyer escort radar picket ship, an LST, and various harbor control, mine craft, and support vessels. By August 1972, the VNN took responsibility for the entire coastal patrol effort when it took over the last 16 U.S. coastal radar installations.

In addition to ships and vessels, the U.S. transferred support bases. The first change of command occurred in November 1969 at Mỹ Tho, and the last in April 1972 at Nhà Bè, Bình Thủy, Cam Ranh Bay, and Đà Nẵng. By 1973, the Vietnam Navy numbered 42,000 men and over 1,400 ships and vessels.

The end
In 1973 and 1974, as a result of the Paris Peace Accords, the United States drastically cut its financial support for the Vietnamese armed forces. The VNN was compelled to reduce its overall operations by half, and its river combat and patrol activities by 70%. To conserve supplies, over 600 river and harbor craft and 22 ships were laid up.

On 19 January 1974, four VNN ships fought a battle with four ships of the Chinese People's Liberation Army Navy over ownership of the Paracel Islands,  due east of Đà Nẵng. The VNN ship Nhựt Tảo (HQ-10) was sunk,  was heavily damaged, and both Trần Khánh Dư (HQ-4) and Trần Bình Trọng (HQ-5) suffered light damage. The Chinese captured and occupied the islands.

In the spring of 1975, North Vietnamese forces occupied all of northern and central South Vietnam, and finally Saigon fell on 30 April 1975. However, Captain Kiem Do had secretly planned and then carried out the evacuation of a flotilla of thirty-five Vietnam Navy and other vessels, with 30,000 sailors, their families, and other civilians on board, and joined the U.S. Seventh Fleet when it sailed for Subic Bay, Philippines. Most of the Vietnamese ships were later taken into the Philippine Navy, though the LSM Lam Giang (HQ-402), fuel barge HQ-474, and gunboat Kéo Ngựa (HQ-604) were scuttled after reaching the open sea and transferring their cargo of refugees and their crews to other ships.

After the war, about 1,300 former VNN vessels including junks were used by the Vietnam People's Navy, making it the largest Southeast Asian navy in the mid-1980s. Some personnel were retained, with 80% of the Ham Tu Brigade in the VPN’s Bach Dang Fleet being South Vietnamese veterans.

Organization

Fleet Command
VNN Fleet Command was directly responsible to the VNN Chief of Naval Operations for the readiness of ships and craft. The Fleet Commander assigned and scheduled ships to operate in the Coastal Zones, Riverine Areas, and the Rung Sat Special Zone. All Fleet Command ships were home ported in Saigon and normally returned there after deployments. When deployed, operational control was assumed by the respective zone or area commander, and the ships operated from the following ports:
 I Coastal Zone – Đà Nẵng
 II Coastal Zone – Nha Trang/Qui Nhơn
 III Coastal Zone – Vũng Tàu/Cần Thơ/Châu Đức
 IV Coastal Zone – An Thoi/Phú Quốc
 Rung Sat Special Zone – Nhà Bè

Flotillas
The VNN was organized into two flotillas: a patrol flotilla and a logistics flotilla. Flotilla I was composed of patrol ships, organized into four squadrons. The patrol types included LSSLs and LSILs which normally operated only in Riverine Areas or the Rung Sat Special Zone; though occasionally they were assigned the four coastal zones. Operational commitments required that half of the patrol flotilla be deployed at all times, with a boat typically spending 40 to 50 days at sea on each patrol. Fleet Command patrol ships assigned to the riverine areas provided naval gunfire support as well as patrolling the main waterways in the riverine areas. One river patrol unit was assigned as convoy escort on the Mekong River to and from the Cambodian border.

Flotilla II was composed of logistic ships, divided into two squadrons, supporting the naval units and bases throughout South Vietnam. Logistic ships were under the administrative control of the Fleet Commander, and under the operational control of the VNN Deputy Chief of Staff for Logistics who acted upon orders from the Central Logistics Command of the Joint General Staff.

UDT

Training
The VNN training establishment consisted of a Training Bureau located at VNN Headquarters, with Training Centers located in Saigon, Nha Trang, and Cam Ranh Bay.

Saigon naval shipyard

The shipyard had been created by the French in 1863 as a major repair and resupply base. In 1969, 1,800 men were employed there, repairing and overhauling vessels, enabling the VNN to maintain its continuous patrols of the coast.

Ranks and insignia

Commanders of the VNN
 Commander (later Navy Captain) Lê Quang Mỹ, 1955–57
 Commander Trần Văn Chơn, 1957–59
 Navy Captain Hồ Tấn Quyền, 1959–63
 Navy Captain (later Vice Admiral) Chung Tấn Cang, 1963–65
 Navy Captain Trần Văn Phấn, 1965–66
 Lieutenant General Cao Văn Viên, September – November 1966 - Temporary after Coup d'État
 Navy Captain (later Rear Admiral) Trần Văn Chơn, 1966–74
 Rear Admiral Lâm Ngươn Tánh, for 2 months between 1974 and 1975
 Vice Admiral Chung Tấn Cang, 24 March – 29 April 1975

See also
 Ships of the Republic of Vietnam Navy
 Army of the Republic of Vietnam
 Republic of Vietnam Military Forces
 Republic of Vietnam Air Force
 Republic of Vietnam Marine Division
 Royal Lao Navy
 Khmer National Navy

References

Bibliography

 This article incorporates material translated from the corresponding page in the Vietnamese Wikipedia.

External links
 US Naval Historical Center : Navy of the Republic of Vietnam
 vietnamresearch.com: Republic of Vietnam Navy

 

Disbanded navies
Military units and formations established in 1952
Military units and formations disestablished in 1975